Paulo Rocha is a Cape Verdean politician, who was appointed to head  the Cape Verde Interior Ministry in 2016.

References

Year of birth missing (living people)
Living people
Cape Verdean politicians
Government ministers of Cape Verde